The 1923–24 Northern Football League season was the 31st in the history of the Northern Football League, a football competition in Northern England.

Clubs

The league featured 14 clubs which competed in the last season, along with one new club:
 Ferryhill Athletic

League table

References

1923-24
1923–24 in English football leagues